Maghrebi Arabic (Western Arabic; as opposed to Eastern or Mashriqi Arabic) is a vernacular Arabic dialect continuum spoken in the Maghreb region, in Morocco, Algeria, Tunisia, Libya, Western Sahara, and Mauritania. It includes Moroccan, Algerian, Tunisian, Libyan, Hassaniya and Maltese. It is known locally as Darja, Derdja, Derja, Derija or Darija, depending on the region's dialect (meaning "common or everyday dialect"). This serves to differentiate the spoken vernacular from Standard Arabic. Maghrebi Arabic has a predominantly Semitic and Arabic vocabulary, although it contains a few Berber loanwords which represent 2–3% of the vocabulary of Libyan Arabic, 8–9% of Algerian and Tunisian Arabic, and 10–15% of Moroccan Arabic. The Maltese language is believed to have its source in a language spoken in Muslim Sicily that ultimately origins from Tunisia, as it contains some typical Maghrebi Arabic areal characteristics.

Name
It refers to any of the varieties of colloquial Maghrebi Arabic. Although it is also common in Algeria and Tunisia to refer to the Maghrebi Arabic varieties directly as languages, similarly it is also common in Egypt and Lebanon to refer to the Mashriqi Arabic varieties directly as languages. For instance, Algerian Arabic would be referred as Dzayri (Algerian) and Tunisian Arabic as Tounsi (Tunisian), and Egyptian Arabic would be referred as Masri (Egyptian) and Lebanese Arabic as Lubnani (Lebanese).

Characteristics
The varieties of Maghrebi Arabic form a dialect continuum. The degree of mutual intelligibility is high between geographically adjacent dialects (such as local dialects spoken in Eastern Morocco and Western Algeria or Eastern Algeria and North Tunisia or South Tunisia and Western Libya), but lower between dialects that are further apart, e.g. between Moroccan and Tunisian Darija. Conversely, Moroccan Darija and particularly Algerian Derja cannot be easily understood by Eastern Arabic speakers (from Egypt, Sudan, Levant, Iraq, and Arabian peninsula) in general.

Maghrebi Arabic continues to evolve by integrating new French or English words, notably in technical fields, or by replacing old French and Italian/Spanish ones with Modern Standard Arabic words within some circles; more educated and upper-class people who code-switch between Maghrebi Arabic and Modern Standard Arabic have more French and Italian/Spanish loanwords, especially the latter came from the time of al-Andalus. Maghrebi dialects all use n- as the first-person singular prefix on verbs, distinguishing them from Levantine dialects and Modern Standard Arabic.

Relationship with Modern Standard Arabic and Berber languages
Modern Standard Arabic is the primary language used in the government, legislation and judiciary of countries in the Maghreb. Maghrebi Arabic is mainly a spoken and vernacular dialect, although it occasionally appears in entertainment and advertising in urban areas of Algeria, Morocco and Tunisia. In Algeria, where Maghrebi Arabic was taught as a separate subject under French colonization, some textbooks in the dialect exist but they are no longer officially endorsed by the Algerian authorities. Maghrebi Arabic has a mostly Semitic Arabic vocabulary. It contains a few Berber loanwords which represent 2–3% of the vocabulary of Libyan Arabic, 8–9% of Algerian and Tunisian Arabic, and 10–15% of Moroccan Arabic. The dialect may also possess a substratum of Punic.

Latin substratum
Additionally, Maghrebi Arabic has a Latin substratum, which may have been derived from the African Romance that was used as an urban lingua franca during the Byzantine Empire period.
Morphologically, this substratum brought the plural noun morphemes -əsh/-osh that are common in northern Moroccan dialects and probably the gender merging in the second person singular of personal pronouns verbs for example in Andalusian Arabic.

Relationship with other languages
Maghrebi Arabic speakers frequently borrow words from French (in Morocco, Algeria and Tunisia), Spanish (in northern Morocco and northwestern Algerian) and Italian (in Libya and Tunisia) and conjugate them according to the rules of their dialects with some exceptions (like passive voice for example). Since it is not always written, there is no standard and it is free to change quickly and to pick up new vocabulary from neighbouring languages. This is somewhat similar to what happened to Middle English after the Norman conquest.

Varieties
 Varieties of Arabic
 Pre-Hilalian Arabic dialects
 Hilalian dialects
 Koinés:
 Algerian Arabic
 Moroccan Arabic
 Tunisian Arabic
 Libyan Arabic
 Jebli Arabic
 Jijel Arabic
 Andalusian Arabic (extinct)
 Siculo-Arabic (extinct)
 Maltese language (descended from Sicilian Arabic, but influenced lexically by Sicilian, Italian, French, and more recently, English)
 Western Bedouin:
 Hassaniya Arabic
 Saharan Arabic

See also

 Maghrebi Arabs
 Varieties of Arabic
 Moroccan Arabic
 Languages of Africa

References

Further reading
 Singer, Hans-Rudolf (1980) “Das Westarabische oder Maghribinische” in Wolfdietrich Fischer and Otto Jastrow (eds.) Handbuch der arabischen Dialekte. Otto Harrassowitz: Wiesbaden. 249–76.

 
Arabic languages
Languages of Gibraltar
Languages of Sicily
Languages of Spain